Deymeh-ye Kuchek (also Romanized as Deymeh-ye Kūchek; also known as Dehmeh-ye Kūchak) is a village in Hoseyni Rural District, in the Central District of Shadegan County, Khuzestan Province, Iran. As of the 2006 census, its population was 161, with there being 25 families.

References 

Populated places in Shadegan County